Weißkirchen in Steiermark is a municipality in the district of Murtal in Styria, Austria.

References

Seetal Alps
Cities and towns in Murtal District